, better known by the stage name , was a Japanese voice actor and the father of Macross star Arihiro Hase. He died of lung cancer on March 8, 2002, at the age of 66. At the time of his death he was a free agent, but he had been previously represented by Aoni Production.

He was most known for playing "Aderans" Nakano-san in Kinnikuman.

Notable voice roles
Majokko Megu-chan (Chō-san)
Devilman (Rockfell)
Ikkyū-san (Shūnen)
GeGeGe no Kitaro 1971 (Konaki Jijii (First voice))
GeGeGe no Kitaro 1985 (Hakusanbō, Satomi's Father, Mermen Boss, Merman, Hiderigami, Gremlin, Kurabboko, Enra-Enra, others)
Magne Robo Gakeen (Tensai Tsuji)
Cyborg 009 1979 (Chang Changku/006)
Nils no Fushigi na Tabi (Emeric, others)
Hana no Ko Lunlun (Yabōki)
Sazae-san (Nanbutsu Isasaka (First Voice)
Puss 'n Boots Travels Around the World (Killer A)
Kinnikuman (Kazuo Nakano, Kani Base, Cements, Okamarasu)
Cutey Honey (Goemon)
High School! Kimengumi (Kiyoshi's Father)
Mōretsu Atarō 1990 (Xgorou)
Yatterman (Zenigata Heiji)
La Seine no Hoshi (Shuro)
Rocky Chuck the Mountain Rat (Bobby)
Akazukin Chacha (Shōnosuke)
Doraemon (Mr. Honekawa - 1st voice)

Dubbing 
Pinocchio as Gideon
The Black Cauldron as Fflewddur Fflam
Back to the Conscience as Gideon
Lady and the Tramp as Joe

References

External links

1936 births
2002 deaths
Japanese male voice actors
Deaths from lung cancer in Japan
20th-century Japanese male actors
21st-century Japanese male actors
Aoni Production voice actors